This is a list of data removed from McDonnell Douglas Phantom in UK service as a result of the editorial process.

Basic specifications

Comparison of Phantom FG.1 with Sea Vixen and Lightning

Aircraft Carrier comparison - HMS Ark Royal and USS Forrestal

List of aircraft
Complete list of UK F-4 Phantoms

List of Phantom bases
UK-based Phantom units
700P Naval Air Squadron
RNAS Yeovilton; April 1968 to February 1969
767 Naval Air Squadron
RNAS Yeovilton; January 1969 to August 1972
892 Naval Air Squadron
RNAS Yeovilton; March 1969 to September 1972
RAF Leuchars; October 1972 to April 1978
No. 6 Squadron
RAF Coningsby; May 1969 to October 1974
No. 23 Squadron
RAF Wattisham; November 1975 to March 1983
No 29 Squadron
RAF Coningsby; December 1974 to March 1987
No 41 Squadron
RAF Coningsby; April 1972 to April 1977
No 43 Squadron
RAF Leuchars; September 1969 to July 1989
No 54 Squadron
RAF Coningsby; August 1969 to April 1974
No 56 Squadron
RAF Wattisham; March 1976 to June 1992
No 228 OCU/No 64 (R) Squadron
RAF Coningsby; August 1986 to April 1987
RAF Leuchars; April 1987 to January 1991
No 74 Squadron
RAF Wattisham; July 1984 to September 1992
No 111 Squadron
RAF Leuchars; July 1974 to January 1990
Phantom Training Flight
RAF Leuchars; August 1972 to May 1978
RAF Wattisham; January 1991 to January 1992
Germany-based Phantom units
No 2 Squadron
RAF Laarbruch; December 1970 to February 1976
No 14 Squadron
RAF Brüggen; June 1970 to January 1976
No 17 Squadron
RAF Brüggen; July 1970 to July 1975
No 19 Squadron
RAF Wildenrath; December 1976 to January 1992
No 31 Squadron
RAF Brüggen; July 1971 to June 1976
No 92 Squadron
RAF Wildenrath; March 1977 to July 1991
Falkland Islands-based Phantom units
No 23 Squadron
RAF Stanley; March 1983 to May 1985
RAF Mount Pleasant; May 1985 to November 1988
No 29 Squadron (Detachment)
RAF Stanley; October 1982 to March 1983
No 1435 Flight
RAF Mount Pleasant; November 1988 to June 1992

Full list of Phantom units

References
Notes

Citations

McDonnell Douglas F-4 Phantom II